Pseuderemias septemstriata is a species of lizard endemic to  Somalia.

References

Pseuderemias
Lacertid lizards of Africa
Reptiles of Somalia
Endemic fauna of Somalia
Reptiles described in 1942
Taxa named by Hampton Wildman Parker